Henri Sillanpää (born 4 June 1979) is a Finnish footballer who plays for BK-48 as a goalkeeper.

International career
He made his debut for the Finnish national team on 3 December 2004 in a friendly match against Oman.

International statistics

Honours

Individual
 Veikkausliiga Goalkeeper of the year 2013

References

External links

1979 births
Living people
People from Tornio
Finnish footballers
Finland international footballers
Finland under-21 international footballers
Veikkausliiga players
Allsvenskan players
Eliteserien players
Vaasan Palloseura players
Finnish expatriate footballers
Expatriate footballers in Sweden
Expatriate footballers in Norway
Finnish expatriate sportspeople in Norway
Närpes Kraft Fotbollsförening players
FC Kiisto players
TP-47 players
AC Allianssi players
GAIS players
Tromsø IL players
Association football goalkeepers
Sportspeople from Lapland (Finland)